As Emperor of the French, Napoleon I created titles of nobility to institute a stable elite in the First French Empire, after the instability resulting from the French Revolution.

Like many others, both before and since, Napoleon found that the ability to confer titles was also a useful tool of patronage which cost the state little treasure. In all, about 2,200 titles were created by Napoleon:

 Princes and Dukes:
Princes of the Imperial family
The Imperial Prince (Napoleon's son, Napoleon II)
Princes of France (8 close family members)
 sovereign princes (3)
 duchies grand fiefs (20)
 victory princes (4)
 victory dukedoms (10)
 other dukedoms (3)
 Counts (251)
 Barons (1,516)
 Knights (385)

Napoleon also established a new knightly order in 1802, the Légion d'honneur, which is still in existence today. The Grand Dignitaries of the French Empire ranked, regardless of noble title, immediately behind the Princes of France.

Creation
Ennoblement started in 1804 with the creation of princely titles for members of Napoleon's family, the House of Bonaparte. Other titles followed:  titles were created and, in 1808, those of count, baron and knight.

Napoleon founded the concept of "nobility of Empire" by an imperial decree on 1 March 1808. The purpose of this creation was to amalgamate the old nobility and the revolutionary middle-class in one peerage system. This step, which aimed at the introduction of a stable elite, was fully in line with the creation of the Legion of Honour and of life senatorial peerages.

A council of the seals and the titles was also created and charged with establishing armorial bearings, and had a monopoly of this new nobility.

These creations are to be distinguished from an order such as the Order of the Bath. These titles of nobility did not have any true privileges, with two exceptions:
 the right to have armorial bearings;
 the lands granted with the title were held in a majorat, transmitted jointly with the title.

Hierarchy
In Napoleon's nobility, there existed a strict and precise hierarchy of the titles, which granted office to some according to their membership of the imperial family, their rank in the army, or their administrative career in the civil or clerical administrations:

 Prince: for members of the imperial family, certain principal leaders of the Empire (Talleyrand was a prince of Bénévent) and some marshals of the Empire
 Duke: for the principal dignitaries and marshals of the Empire
 Count: for the ministers, senators, archbishops, councilors of State, the president of the corps legislative, some of the generals
 Baron: chairmen of the Court of Auditors, bishops, mayors of 37 good cities, bankers, some of the generals
 Knight: other functions

One could receive a title without exercising one of its enumerated functions. The title of marquis was not used during the First French Empire, and it therefore became very fashionable after the Bourbon Restoration, since it was not perceived to be tainted by the Napoleonic creations.

This nobility is essentially a "nobility of service", to a large extent made up of soldiers (67.9%), some civil servants (22%) and some collaborating members of the Ancien Régime. Napoleon's nobility was not abolished after the Bourbon Restoration, but it largely disappeared gradually for natural reasons, due in part to the great number of soldiers who had been promoted and subsequently died during the Napoleonic Wars.

In 1975, there were 239 remaining families belonging to the First Empire's nobility. Of those, perhaps about 135 were titled. Only one princely title (Essling, since Sievers is no longer used and Pontecorvo is merged with Prince Murat) and seven ducal titles remain today.

Heraldry

 
Along with a new system of titles of nobility, the First French Empire also introduced a new system of heraldry.

Napoleonic heraldry was based on traditional heraldry but was characterised by a stronger sense of hierarchy. It employed a rigid system of additional marks in the shield to indicate official functions and positions. Another notable difference from traditional heraldry was the toques, which replaced coronets. The toques were surmounted by ostrich feathers: dukes had 7, counts had 5, barons had 3, and knights had 1. The number of lambrequins was also regulated: 3, 2, 1 and none respectively. As many grantees were self-made men, and the arms often alluded to their life or specific actions, many new or unusual charges were also introduced.

The most characteristic mark of Napoleonic heraldry was the additional marks in the shield to indicate official functions and positions. These came in the form of quarters in various colours, and would be differenced further by marks of the specific rank or function. In this system, the arms of knights had an ordinary gules, charged with the emblem of the Legion of Honour;  Barons a quarter gules in chief sinister, charged with marks of the specific rank or function; counts a quarter azure in chief dexter, charged with marks of the specific rank or function; and dukes had a chief gules semé of stars argent.

The said 'marks of the specific rank or function' as used by Barons and Counts depended on the rank or function held by the individual. Military barons and counts had a sword on their quarter, members of the Conseil d'Etat had a chequy, ministers had a lion's head, prefects had a wall beneath an oak branch, mayors had a wall, landowners had a wheat stalk, judges had a balance, members of Academies had a palm, etc.

A decree of 3 March 1810 states: "The name, arms and livery shall pass from the father to all sons" although the distinctive marks of title could only pass to the son who inherited it. This provision applied only to the bearers of Napoleonic titles.

The Napoleonic system of heraldry did not outlast the First French Empire. The Second French Empire (1852–1870) made no effort to revive it, although the official arms of France were again those of Napoleon I.

Titles

Princes
There were three types of princely titles: 
 the princes impériaux or imperial princes (members of the imperial family):
 the prince impérial or Crown Prince, Napoleon II (Napoleon's son)
 the princes français or French princes:
Joseph Bonaparte (from 1804), Napoleon's brother, hereditary in the male and female grandchildren line
Louis Bonaparte (from 1804), Napoleon's brother
Joachim Murat (from 1804), Napoleon's brother-in-law
Eugène de Beauharnais (from 1805), Napoleon's adopted son
Élisa Bonaparte, Napoleon's sister
Jérôme Bonaparte (from 1806), Napoleon's younger brother
Stéphanie de Beauharnais (from 1806), Napoleon's adopted daughter, cousin of his wife
Joseph Fesch (from 1807), Napoleon's uncle
Lucien Bonaparte (from 1815), Napoleon's brother
 the princes souverains or sovereign princes (who had received a vassal principality of the Empire):
Charles-Maurice de Talleyrand-Périgord, Prince de Bénévent
Louis-Alexandre Berthier, Prince de Neuchâtel, 1806; see below also a victory title of Prince de Wagram
Jean-Baptiste Bernadotte, Prince de Pontecorvo, 1806–1810
Lucien Murat, Prince de Pontecorvo, 1812–1815
Jean Lannes, Prince de Sievers; see below also a victory title of Duc de Montebello
Two other titles fall into this category but are not as clear cut as the others:
Pauline Bonaparte was granted the principality of Guastalla, with title of princess and duchess of Guastalla, but held it for less than five months (from 30 March to 14 August 1806) before its cession back to the kingdom of Italy
Eugène de Beauharnais received the honorary title of prince of Venice
 the titres de victoire or victory titles, granted after exploits and having only an honorary role (in most cases awarded as a 'promotion' to holders of ducal victory titles):
Marshal Davout, Prince d'Eckmühl, 1809 (extinct 1853); also duc d'Auerstaedt (see below)
Marshal Berthier, Prince de Wagram, 1809 (extinct 1918), for the battle of Wagram (see above); also a sovereign title of Prince de Neuchâtel; also duc de Valengin (which was not a victory title).
Marshal Masséna, Prince d'Essling, 1810; also duc de Rivoli
Marshal Ney, Prince de la Moskowa, 1813 (extinct 1969); also duc d'Elchingen. "Bataille de la Moskowa" is the French name for the Battle of Borodino.

Dukes
There were three types of ducal titles: 
 the duchés grands-fiefs or dukes of large fiefs outside the territory of the First French Empire (but with no rights of sovereignty):
General Arrighi de Casanova, Duc de Padoue, 1808 (extinct 1888)
Marshal Bessières, Duc d'Istrie, 1809 (extinct 1856)
Jean-Jacques-Régis de Cambacérès, Duc de Parme, 1808 (extinct 1824)
General Caulaincourt, Duc de Vicenze, 1808 (extinct 1896)
General Clarke, Duc de Feltre, 1809, also Comte d'Hunebourg
General Duroc, Duc de Frioul, 1808 (extinct 1829)
Joseph Fouché, Duc d'Otrante, 1808 (extant)
Martin-Michel-Charles Gaudin, Duc de Gaëte, 1809 (extinct 1841)
Charles-François Lebrun, Duc de Plaisance, 1808 (extinct 1927)
Marshal MacDonald, Duc de Tarente, 1809 (extinct 1912)
Hugues-Bernard Maret, Duc de Bassano, 1809 (extinct 1906)
Marshal Moncey, Duc de Conegliano, 1808 (extinct 1842)
Marshal Mortier, Duc de Trévise, 1808 (extinct 1912)
Jean-Baptiste Nompère de Champagny, Duc de Cadore, (extinct 1893)
Marshal Oudinot, Duc de Reggio, 1810 (extinct 1956)
Claude Ambroise Régnier, Duc de Massa, 1809
General Savary, Duc de Rovigo (extinct 1872)
Marshal Soult, Duc de Dalmatie, 1808 (extinct 1857)
Marshal Victor, Duc de Belluno, 1808 (extinct 1853)
 the titres de victoires or victory titles, comparable to the princely titles of the same category:
Marshal Lefebvre, Duc de Dantzig, 28 May 1807 (extinct 1820); Dantzig was then still a city republic, which became part of Prussia after Napoleon's defeat, and is now Gdańsk in Poland
Marshal Ney, Duc d'Elchingen, 1808 (extinct 1969); also Prince de la Moskowa
General Junot, Duc d'Abrantès, 1808 (extinct 1859, but extended in female line in 1869; extinct again 1982)
Marshal Davout, Duc d'Auerstaedt, 1808 (extinct 1853, extended to collaterals); also Prince d'Eckmühl
Marshal Augereau, Duc de Castiglione, 1808 (extinct 1816)
Marshal Lannes, Duc de Montebello, 1808
Marshal Marmont, Duc de Raguse, 1808 (extinct 1852); present-day Dubrovnik, on the Croatian coast, was conquered as part of Napoleon's own Italian kingdom, soon part of France's imperial enclave the Illyrian province
Marshal Masséna, Duc de Rivoli, 1808; also Prince d'Essling
Marshal Kellermann, Duc de Valmy, 1808 (extinct 1868)
Marshal Suchet, Duc d'Albufera, 1813
General Girard, Duc de Ligny, 1815, not recognized by the Bourbon Restoration
 the ordinary titles, which went before the name:
Empress Joséphine, Duchesse de Navarre, 1810, ducal title inherited by her grandsons (extinct 1852)
Emmerich Joseph de Dalberg, Duc de Dalberg, 1810 (extinct 1833)
Denis Decrès, Duc Decrés, 1813 (extinct 1820)

For a ducal title to be hereditary, it was necessary for the holder to have at least a 200,000 francs annual income and that the land which generated the income be held in a majorat for the inheritor of the dukedom.

These titles were allotted only to Marshals of the Empire and to certain ministers.

Counts 
The ordinary title of count (comte) always went in front of the name. It was subject to the same rules as the title of duke but with an income threshold of only 30,000 francs.

Senators, Ministers, and Archbishops were all counts. From 1808 until 1814, 388 titles were created.

Barons
The title of baron was comparable with that of count, except that the income threshold fell to 15,000 francs.

The mayors of the large cities and the bishops were all barons. Between 1808 and 1814, 1,090 titles of baron were created.

Today, the title of baron of the First French Empire is still claimed by families including d'Allemagne, Ameil, d'Andlau, d'Astorg, Auvray, Caffarelli, Christophe, Daru, Dein, Dubois, Eblé, Evain, Fabvier, de Croy, Fain, Géloes, Gourgaud, Guerrier de Dumast, Hamelin, Hottinguer, Laffitte, Lefebvre, Lepic, Méquet, Mallet, Marbot family, Martin de Lagarde, Massias, Nérin, Nicolas, Parmentier, Petiet, Pinoteau, Portalis, Rey, Rippert, Roederer, de Saint-Didier, de Saint-Geniès, de Saizieu, Salmon, de Saluce, Seillère, Strolz, Testot-Ferry, Thiry, de Villeneuve, Werlein.

Knights
The title of knight (chevalier) also went in front of the name. There was an obligation to have an income of at least 3,000 francs, and a majorat on the land generating the income was not obligatory.

All the knights of the Légion d’honneur received the title of chevalier d'Empire ("knight of the Empire"), but there had to be three generations of successive knights for the title to become hereditary. Between 1808 and 1814, 1,600 titles of knight were created.

See also
French nobility

References